The Johnstown Generals were a professional indoor football team based in Johnstown, Pennsylvania. The Generals began play in 2011 as an expansion team as part of the original Ultimate Indoor Football League six. The Generals were the fourth indoor football team to play in Johnstown, succeeding the original Indoor Football League's Johnstown Jackals (2000), the National Indoor Football League's Johnstown J-Dogs (2001), and the American Indoor Football Association's Johnstown Riverhawks (2005–2007). The Generals were owned by Jeff Bollinger. The Generals played their home games at the Cambria County War Memorial Arena in Johnstown, Pennsylvania.

Franchise history

2011

The team was coached by Quinteen Robinson, who played on the three previous indoor football teams to play in Johnstown.

2012

Players of note

Roster

Awards and honors
The following is a list of all Generals players who have won league awards:

Other notable former players

 Jason Goode - WR
 Shea McKeen - DL
 DeQwan Young - DB

Coaches of note

Head coaches

Note: Statistics are correct through the end of the 2012 UIFL season.

Coaching staff

Statistics and records

Season-by-season results
Note: The Finish, Wins, Losses, and Ties columns list regular season results and exclude any postseason play.

* Season currently in progress

External links
Johnstown Generals official site

References

 
2011 establishments in Pennsylvania
2012 disestablishments in Pennsylvania